Asclepias longifolia, the longleaf milkweed, is a flowering plant native to the southern United States from Texas to Delaware. It is rare in the north end of its range and is presumed to be extinct in Delaware.

References

longifolia